Shadow Ballads is a collection of short stories by Vermont horror/fantasy author Matt Spencer. It was published by Inked In Blood Publications, a small press publisher of horror and fantasy fiction, in 2011.

Contents 

 Formal Dinner and Demon Dreams
 Have Some Dragon's Blood
 Lambs of Slaughter in Blue and Gold
 The Face in the Flame
 Voice of Reason
 Useful Instincts
 The Two Dragons of the East End

Fantasy short story collections
Horror short story collections
2011 short story collections